Yassin Markus Idbihi (born July 24, 1983) is a former Moroccan-German professional basketball player. Idbihi spent the majority of his career in Germany and played one season in France for Limoges CSP.

Professional career
He made his professional debut with Dragons Rhöndorf. He then played college basketball at the University at Buffalo. After that he returned to Germany and first played for Köln 99ers, then one season in French Pro B with Limoges CSP and later for Phantoms Braunschweig and Alba Berlin. In July 2013, he signed a two-year deal with Bayern Munich. In July 2015, he signed a two-year deal with Brose Bamberg.

After the 2016–17 season, Idbihi retired and instead joined the staff of Brose Bamberg.

References

External links
 Eurobasket.com Profile
 Euroleague.net Profile
 FIBA.com Profile

1983 births
Living people
Alba Berlin players
Basketball Löwen Braunschweig players
Brose Bamberg players
Buffalo Bulls men's basketball players
Centers (basketball)
FC Bayern Munich basketball players
German men's basketball players
German expatriate basketball people in France
German expatriate basketball people in the United States
German people of Moroccan descent
German sportspeople of African descent
Köln 99ers players
Limoges CSP players
Sportspeople from Cologne
German basketball coaches